Ravindra Gautam  is an Indian film/serial director, script writer and producer. He made his directorial debut with Kasauti Zindagi Ki. Gautam received "ITA Award for Best Director-Drama" for direction in Bade Achhe Lagte Hain.

Career
Ravindra Gautam was born and raised in Lucknow, India. He joined Yayavar Rang Mandal in Lucknow when he was studying in Lucknow University. A banker by profession, quit his job and shifted to Mumbai. He got his break as a director with Kasauti Zindagi Ki. Gautam received "ITA Award for Best Director-Drama" for Bade Achhe Lagte Hain. He also worked on Pavitra Rishta, Parichay, Mann Kee Awaaz Pratigya and Uttaran.

Education
He studied at St. Francis' College, Lucknow, and later in Lucknow University. He completed his degree in software technology.

Filmography

Webseries
 Maharani Season 2 (2022)

Film
 Ekkees Toppon Ki Salaami (2014)

Television
 Karthik Purnima(2019)
 Kaal Bhairav Rahasya 2               (2018)
 Meri Durga               (2017)
 Begusarai                (2015)
 Kumkum Bhagya            (2014)
 Do Dil Ek Jaan           (2013)
 Madhubala-Ek Ishq Ek Junoon (2012)
 Kya Huaa Tera Vaada      (2012)
 Parichay                 (2011)
 Bade Achhe Lagte Hain    (2011)
 Tere Liye                (2010)
 Armanon Ka Balidaan-Aarakshan           (2010)
 Pavitra Rishta           (2009)
 Mann Kee Awaaz Pratigya  (2009)
 Bandini           (2009)
 Uttaran                  (2008)
 Karam Apnaa Apnaa        (2006)
 Kasauti Zindagi Ki      (2001)

References

Hindi-language film directors
Living people
University of Lucknow alumni
Indian television directors
Film directors from Uttar Pradesh
Year of birth missing (living people)